Whetstone Butte (elevation 3150 feet (955 m)) is a mountain in the Badlands in Adams County in southwestern North Dakota in the United States. As of 2000, the population of Whetstone Butte is 2,593.

References

Landforms of Adams County, North Dakota
Mountains of North Dakota